Kallimodon is a genus of sphenodont from the Late Jurassic of Bavaria, southern Germany.

Systematics
Kallimodon was originally described as a species of Homoeosaurus by Karl von Zittel in 1887. However, in 1963 it was renamed Kallimodon due to differences from the Homoeosaurus type species. In 1997, Kallimodon was sunk as a junior synonym of Leptosaurus, with the type species referred to as L. pulchellus. However, subsequent studies find Kallimodon to be valid and distinct from Leptosaurus, being closely related to Sapheosaurus. One specimen previously referred to this genus is actually a distinct taxon.

References

Sphenodontia
Late Jurassic reptiles of Europe